Moritz is an unincorporated community in Deuel County, in the U.S. state of South Dakota.

History
A post office called Moritz was established in 1899, and remained in operation until it was discontinued in 1923. The community was named for Andrew Moritz, an early settler.

References

Unincorporated communities in Deuel County, South Dakota
Unincorporated communities in South Dakota